Konstantin Sergeyevich Kovalyov (born 14 January 2000) is a Russian football player. He plays as a right-back for FC Avangard Kursk on loan from FC Rostov.

Club career
He made his debut in the Russian Football National League for FC Avangard Kursk on 7 July 2019 in a game against FC Rotor Volgograd and was sent off for the second bookable offence in the 23rd minute of the game.

On 13 July 2020, he moved to the Russian Premier League club FC Rostov. He made his Russian Premier League debut for Rostov on 19 August 2020 in a game against FC Dynamo Moscow. On 22 September 2020, he was loaned to FC Baltika Kaliningrad. On 12 January 2021, Rostov recalled Kovalyov from loan. On 18 February 2021, he returned to Baltika on a new loan until the end of the 2020–21 season. On 28 December 2021, he returned to Baltika once again, on loan until the end of the 2021–22 season. However, he suffered a serious injury and did not appear for Baltika in that season.

Career statistics

Club

References

External links
 Profile by Russian Football National League
 
 

2000 births
Sportspeople from Kursk
Living people
Russian footballers
Association football midfielders
FC Avangard Kursk players
FC Rostov players
FC Baltika Kaliningrad players
Russian Premier League players
Russian First League players